Gregory Alexander John Burgess (born 6 July 1954) is a former New Zealand rugby union player. A prop, Burgess represented Auckland at a provincial level, and was a member of the New Zealand national side, the All Blacks, in 1980 and 1981. He played two matches for the All Blacks, including one full international. He went on to win consecutive national powerlifting titles from 1985 to 1991, and was second in the shot put at the national track and field championships in 1984 and 1985.

Burgess became a successful investor, with interests in property and shares. In 2008 he appeared on the New Zealand National Business Review Rich List for the first time, with an estimated wealth of NZ$60 million.

References

1954 births
Living people
Rugby union players from Auckland
People educated at Marcellin College, Auckland
University of Otago alumni
New Zealand rugby union players
New Zealand international rugby union players
Auckland rugby union players
Rugby union props
New Zealand investors
Ponsonby RFC players